Return to the Sea is the first studio album by Islands. It was released by Equator Records on 4 April 2006. "Rough Gem" was released as a single from the album. The remastered version of the album was released on 11 November 2016.

Critical reception

At Metacritic, which assigns a weighted average score out of 100 to reviews from mainstream critics, the album received an average score of 80 based on 18 reviews, indicating "generally favorable reviews".

Tim Sendra of AllMusic gave the album 4 stars out of 5, saying: "On their debut record, Return to the Sea, Montreal's Islands have crafted a rich, exciting, and emotionally deep sounding album that carries on the freewheeling spirit and sound of the Unicorns as well as that of the Elephant 6 bands of the late '90s." John Motley of Pitchfork gave the album an 8.4 out of 10, calling it "a sprawling, gorgeous collection of pop songs that draws from disparate sources such as calypso, country, and hip-hop."

No Ripchord placed it at number 10 on the "Top 50 Albums of 2006" list.

Track listing

Personnel
Credits adapted from liner notes.

Musicians
 Nick Diamonds – vocals (1, 2, 3, 4, 6, 7, 8, 9, 10), guitar (1, 3, 4, 7, 8, 10), clavinet (2), organ (5, 7, 9), synthesizer (5, 6)
 J'aime Tambeur – drums (1, 2, 3, 4, 5, 6, 8, 9, 10), percussion (3, 4, 7, 8), drum machine (7)
 Patrice Agbokou – bass guitar (1, 3, 4, 7)
 Spencer Krug – piano (1), synthesizer (1)
 Dan Boeckner – guitar (1, 6)
 Jim Guthrie – guitar (1)
 Tim Kingsbury – bass guitar (1)
 Regine Chassagne – accordion (2), piano (2, 5), steel drums (7), recorder (7)
 Richard Reed Parry – double bass (2, 5, 9, 10), background vocals (6), fiddle (8)
 Mauricio Lobos – charango (2, 5)
 Becky Foon – cello (2, 5, 8)
 Sarah Neufeld – violin (2, 5, 8)
 Pietro Amato – French horn (2, 10)
 Frank Lozano – bass clarinet (2, 8, 9), flute (5)
 Busdriver – vocals (6)
 Subtitle – vocals (6)
 Steve McDonald – bass guitar (6)
 Kaveh Nabatien – cuica (7), trumpet (9)
 Michael Feuerstack – lap steel guitar (8)

Technical personnel
 Islands – production, mixing
 Mark Lawson – production, engineering, mixing
 Steve Major – mixing assistance
 Nilesh Patel – mastering
 Nick Diamonds – string/horn/reed arrangement, layout
 Jamie Thompson - reed arrangement
 Richard Reed Parry – string/horn/reed arrangement
 Sarah Neufeld – string/horn/reed arrangement
 Pietro Amato – string/horn/reed arrangement
 Frank Lozano – string/horn/reed arrangement
 Patrick Francis Guay – layout
 Caspar David Friedrich – cover painting (The Sea of Ice)

References

Further reading

External links
 
 

2006 debut albums
Islands (band) albums